Logan Pyett (born May 26, 1988) is a Canadian professional ice hockey defenceman who is currently playing for HSC Csíkszereda in the Erste Liga. Pyett was drafted by the Detroit Red Wings in the seventh round of the 2006 NHL Entry Draft, 212th overall.

Playing career
Pyett played major junior hockey with the Regina Pats in the Western Hockey League (WHL). He was also selected to play for Canada at the 2008 World Junior Ice Hockey Championships winning the Gold Medal. On May 24, 2008, Pyett was signed to a three-year, entry-level contract with his draft club, the Detroit Red Wings.

After four seasons within the Red Wings organization, Pyett was not tendered a qualifying offer and as a free agent Pyett signed a one-year deal as a free agent with the New York Rangers on July 10, 2012. He was assigned for the duration of his contract to AHL affiliate, the Connecticut Whale, for the 2012–13 season.

After two seasons in the Kontinental Hockey League with stints between Vityaz Podolsk, Admiral Vladivostok and Severstal Cherepovets, Pyett returned to North America, securing a one-year AHL contract with the Lehigh Valley Phantoms on August 21, 2015.

Before beginning the 2015–16 season, Pyett was diagnosed with Sarcoma in his upper leg. He was unable to appear in a game with the Phantoms and after two years off recovering, returned to the professional circuit in agreeing to a one-year contract with Japanese club, Tohoku Free Blades of the Asia League Ice Hockey.

In making a successful return from cancer with the Free Blades, Pyett returned to the AHL for the 2018–19 season, agreeing to terms on a one-year contract with the Hershey Bears, affiliate to the Washington Capitals, on August 17, 2018. Through three months into the season, Pyett featured in just 10 games with the Bears before opting to conclude his tenure in Hershey in order to again pursue a contract abroad on December 7, 2018. Pyett quickly pursued an offer abroad, agreeing to a contract for the remainder of the season in Finland, with KooKoo of the Liiga, on December 10, 2018.

Career statistics

Regular season and playoffs

International

Awards and honours

References

External links

1988 births
Living people
Admiral Vladivostok players
Canadian expatriate ice hockey players in Russia
Canadian expatriate ice hockey players in the United States
Canadian ice hockey defencemen
Connecticut Whale (AHL) players
Detroit Red Wings draft picks
Frederikshavn White Hawks players
Grand Rapids Griffins players
HC Vityaz players
Hershey Bears players
HSC Csíkszereda players
Ice hockey people from Saskatchewan
KooKoo players
Regina Pats players
Severstal Cherepovets players
Tohoku Free Blades players
Canadian expatriate ice hockey players in Romania
Canadian expatriate ice hockey players in Denmark
Canadian expatriate ice hockey players in Finland
Canadian expatriate ice hockey players in Japan